John Couture (born September 6, 1947) is a former Canadian football player who played for the Montreal Alouettes. He won the Grey Cup with them in 1970. He previously played junior football for the Hamilton Hurricanes.

References

1947 births
Living people
Montreal Alouettes players
Canadian football slotbacks
Sportspeople from Hamilton, Ontario
Players of Canadian football from Ontario